The Best Soccer Player category of the ESPY Award was presented in 2000, 2001, 2005, and 2006 to the soccer (association football) player adjudged to be the best in a given calendar year among those contesting the sport on the professional or international level, irrespective of gender or nation represented. The award was bifurcated in 2002, but the resulting Best Male and Best Female Soccer Player ESPY Awards were joined once more in 2005.  The award was effectively discontinued in 2005 and replaced by the Best MLS Player ESPY Award (which was first awarded in 2006), as the 2006 award went to a worldwide star not to an American as in the previous years.

During the award's three years, the voting panel comprised variously fans, who participated through Internet balloting; sportswriters and broadcasters, sports executives, and retired sportspersons, termed collectively experts; and ESPN personalities. The ESPY Awards ceremony was conducted in February and awards conferred reflected performance and achievement over the twelve months previous to presentation. Since 2005, voting was undertaken exclusively by fans over the Internet from among nominees selected by the ESPN Select Nominating Committee, and awards have been presented in July to reflect performance and achievement over the twelve months previous to presentation.

List of winners

See also
Landon Donovan MVP Award (Major League Soccer MVP Award)
FIFA World Player of the Year
FIFA Women's World Cup awards
FIFA World Cup awards
African Footballer of the Year
Asian Footballer of the Year
European Footballer of the Year
Oceania Footballer of the Year
South American Footballer of the Year

References

External links

ESPY Awards
American soccer trophies and awards
Awards established in 2001
Awards disestablished in 2006